Wanda R. Smith High School, formerly Keene High School (KHS), is a public high school located in Keene, Texas and classified as a 3A school by the UIL.  It is part of the Keene Independent School District located in central Johnson County.  In 2015, the school was rated "Met Standard" by the Texas Education Agency. The school has been given a bronze rating from U.S. News & World Report, who ranked it as one of the best schools in Texas.

History
Students in Keene were served by Cleburne High School prior to the establishment of 
Keene High School, which saw its first graduating class in 1991. The school was later renamed  in honor of Wanda R. Smith, former superintendent of Keene ISD.

Campus
Wanda R. Smith High School is part of the district campus which includes the elementary, intermediate, and junior high schools. The high school facilities include 20 classrooms, a library, a gymnasium, a cross country course, and a field where a track is built.  Currently new facilities are being built to expand the size of the campus.

Athletics
The Keene Smith Chargers compete in these sports - 

Football, Volleyball, Cross Country, Basketball, Soccer, Golf, Tennis, Track, Baseball & Softball

Extracurricular activities
Student groups and activities include Beta Club, FCCLA, National Honor Society, and student council.

References

External links
Keene ISD

Schools in Johnson County, Texas
Public high schools in Texas
Educational institutions established in 1989
1989 establishments in Texas